Shanjuan Chunyue (pronounced ) is a Chinese green tea produced in Shanjian Village, Yixing, Jiangsu province.

Origin 

Tea farmers in Shizuoka Prefecture in Japan had imported tea trees from China in 1890, altered it into Yabukita (Chinese: 薮北茶树). In 1990s, Chinese tea farmers in south of Yixing imported Yabukita, mixed up with Yangxian tea (Chinese: 阳羡茶) to produce Shanjuan Chunyue. Because it's based around the famous Shanjuan Cave and the tea leave shaped like a crescent moon, hence the name.

Characters 
The tea leaves are shaped like a crescent moon in dull green color.

Production 

There are six steps in production: Shaqing (Chinese: 杀青), using heat to stop enzyme; Cooling (Chinese: 摊凉); 
Forming (Chinese: 理条成形); Cooling resurgence (Chinese: 摊凉回潮); Drying (Chinese: 整形干燥) and Finishing (Chinese: 足干提香).

See also 
 List of Chinese teas

References

Chinese tea grown in Jiangsu
Yixing
Green tea